Campanula carpatica, the tussock bellflower or Carpathian harebell, is a species of flowering plant in the family Campanulaceae.

Description 
Campanula carpatica is a low-growing herbaceous perennial. Plants possess basal leaves and thin, white rhizomes. Stems grow up to 45cm long. Flowers are solitary and stand on stalks ranging from 10-15cm long. Flowers are purple in colour and plants bloom from June to August.

Distribution

Native Range 
Campanula carpatica is native to parts of Europe including the Czech Republic, Romania, Slovakia, Ukraine, Poland and Western Russia. It can also be found growing within the Carpathian Mountains of Central Europe.

Introduced Range 
Campanula carpatica has also been introduced into areas outside of its natural range. This species was introduced further into Europe in Hungary, Denmark, Belgium, France, Norway and the United Kingdom. The species was also introduced into North America where it has been recorded in the states of Connecticut and Michigan.

Habitat 
Campanula carpatica naturally grows in elevated, mountainous habitat where they grow in and amongst rocks.

Cultivation 
It was introduced to the Royal Botanic Garden at Kew in 1774 by Nikolaus Joseph von Jacquin. 

Several cultivars in shades of white, blue, pink and purple, have been developed for garden use. 

This plant has gained the Royal Horticultural Society's Award of Garden Merit.

References

carpatica
Flora of Eastern Europe
Garden plants of Europe
Groundcovers
Plants described in 1770
Taxa named by Nikolaus Joseph von Jacquin